Kuninjku is a dialect of Bininj Kunwok, an Australian Aboriginal language. The Aboriginal people who speak Kuninjku are the Bininj people, who live primarily in western Arnhem Land. Kuninjku is spoken primarily in the east of the Bininj Kunwok speaking areas, particularly the outstations of Maningrida such as Mumeka, Marrkolidjban, Mankorlod, Barrihdjowkkeng, Kakodbebuldi, Kurrurldul and Yikarrakkal.

References

Further reading 
 , 2 volumes

External links
Bininj Kunwok online dictionary

Kunwok

Gunwinyguan languages
Arnhem Land
Indigenous Australian languages in the Northern Territory